Healesville Freeway is a proposed freeway in the eastern suburbs of Melbourne, Australia.  It was initially proposed in 1969, to run between Riversdale Road in Box Hill South, intersecting Springvale Road and then to Maroondah Highway in Coldstream.

In 2011, VicRoads deemed the freeway reservation between Springvale Road in Forest Hill and Boronia Road in Vermont to no longer be necessary for road building purposes, and this section was reviewed for future non-road uses.

In 2018, the section between Springvale Road and Boronia Road was gradually released back to the Crown to become parkland, including bicycle and pedestrian paths.

The land reserved for the Healesville freeway between Boronia Road/Eastlink towards Maroondah Highway in Mooroolbark was further considered to be incorporated – in part – into the Corridor D option of the North East Link (freeway) Project in 2017–2018.

Smaller sections of the original freeway route reservation, at both ends of the route, have subsequently been released for other uses since 1979. The remainder of the land remains reserved for use by VicRoads.

Planned route 

Starting at the intersecton of EastLink with a full freeway junction, it will then head north east, finally joining Mooroolbark Road and terminating at Maroondah Highway at the border of Mooroolbark and Lilydale, linking up with the proposed Lilydale Bypass.

The freeway was originally designated in the 1969 Melbourne Transportation Plan as part of the F9 Freeway corridor, extending past Springvale Road, joining Riversdale Road and winding through Glen Iris to join the M1 Monash Freeway at Burke Road.

See also

References

Highways and freeways in Melbourne
Proposed roads in Australia